William Faulkner was an English-born Australian professional soccer player who played as a full-back. He was also an international player for the Australia national soccer team.

International career
Faulker played his first and only international match for Australia on 14 June 1924 in a 0–1 loss to Canada.

Career statistics

International

References

Australian soccer players
Association football defenders
Australia international soccer players
Year of birth missing
Year of death missing